The September Society, by Charles Finch, is the mystery set in Oxford and London, England in autumn 1866, during the Victorian era.  It is the second novel in a series featuring gentleman and amateur detective Charles Lenox, and the first of two books Finch has written about Oxford, along with The Last Enchantments.

Plot summary

A student at Lincoln College at the University of Oxford goes missing.  His mother engages Charles Lenox to solve the mystery of his disappearance.  Lenox, himself a graduate of Oxford, revisits his alma mater to piece together the clues in this kidnapping case which, upon the discovery of a body, becomes a murder investigation.  Eventually the trail leads Lenox back to London and the headquarters of a mysterious society.

Lenox’s evolving friendship and potential romance with his childhood friend and next-door neighbor Lady Jane is a central subplot.  Additionally, the book introduces Lord John Dallington, a young wastrel aristocrat, as Lenox’s apprentice.

Publication history
The September Society''', was first published in hardcover by St. Martin’s Minotaur and released on August 5, 2008.  The trade paperback was released in 2009.  A large print edition was published by Center Point Publishing in February 2010.

See also
 Literature in Oxford

References

External links
 The September Society Official Macmillan Page
 Starred review by The Library Journal Review by Booklist Review by Richmond Times-Dispatch''

2008 American novels
American mystery novels
University of Oxford in fiction
Lincoln College, Oxford
Novels set in Oxford
Novels set in Victorian England
Novels set in London
Fiction set in 1866
Novels by Charles Finch
Charles Lenox novels